Fay Wolf (born August 21, 1978) is an American actress, singer, songwriter, pianist, and professional organizer. Originally from Connecticut, she now resides in Los Angeles.

Early life

Fay Wolf was born August 21, 1978, in Fairfield, Connecticut. She has been performing since a young age, starting with plays and musicals at schools. She attended Boston University School for the Arts, earning a BFA in Acting. Wolf now lives in Los Angeles, California.

Musical and television career

Wolf has appeared in many television shows such as All My Children, Numb3rs, and NCIS: Los Angeles. Some of her songs have been used in The Vampire Diaries, Grey's Anatomy, One Tree Hill, Covert Affairs, and Pretty Little Liars. Fay's cover for The Outfield's "Your Love" was used exclusively for the Pretty Little Liars Soundtrack in 2011 with a music video released in 2012. In 2009 Wolf released her first EP, Blankets. In 2011 she released her first full-length album, Spiders," funded by a successful Kickstarter campaign. Wolf has since released several singles.

Organization career

Fay Wolf is also a professional organizer/decluttering pro. She owns and runs a company called New Order. Wolf hosts workshops and works with creative clients to inspire and assist with both the "inner and outer clutter." Her first book New Order: A Decluttering Handbook For Creative Folks (And Everyone Else) was released by Ballantine/Random House in 2016. A Spanish version of became available in 2019. She has worked with Apartment Therapy as an expert for many years. Wolf gave a keynote speech at Etsy's conference in 2016 and has contributed to several publications.

Filmography

References

External links
 
 
 
 

1978 births
Living people
American television actresses
American women singer-songwriters
People from Fairfield, Connecticut
Actresses from Connecticut
Singer-songwriters from New York (state)
21st-century American singers
21st-century American women singers
Singer-songwriters from Connecticut